Kalij Kuh (also Romanized as Kalīj Kūh; also known as Kalīch Kūh) is a village in Sakht Sar Rural District, in the Central District of Ramsar County, Mazandaran Province, Iran. At the 2006 census, its population was 142, in 37 families.

References 

Populated places in Ramsar County